Robert John Gledden (26 December 1855 – 5 November 1927) was an English-born Australian surveyor and public benefactor.

Gledden was born at Bishopwearmouth, Sunderland, County Durham, England. As a youth Gledden spent many years in Germany, Finland and other continental countries, and became a good linguist. He moved to Australia around 1890 and was licensed as a surveyor in Queensland. He went to Perth, Western Australia, about the beginning of 1892, and after practising for a few months as a surveyor was asked by William Marmion, then the minister of lands, to take charge of mining surveys at Coolgardie. He made a preliminary survey there and about a year later laid out the site of Kalgoorlie. Gledden acted as mining registrar and warden at different times and was well acquainted with all the early pioneers at the goldfields. Having a good memory and a keen sense of humour his reminiscences of life during the early days of the goldfields were found very interesting in later years. 

Gledden retired in 1900 and spent much time travelling with his wife before settling at Caulfield near Melbourne. After his wife died about 1921, Gleddon continued to travel, but kept his interest in Western Australia and spent a good deal of his time there. Gledden died at Perth on 5 November 1927, there were no children. He was a good business man and made money largely out of investing in land in Western Australia. His will provided that the whole of his estate, subject to three annuities, should go to the University of Western Australia to provide scholarships in applied science, beginning 10 years after his death. The amount made available to the university was about £55,000, and the income is used mainly to provide the Robert Gledden and Maud Gledden travelling fellowships of £750 a year. In addition there are Gledden studentships to enable engineers or surveyors to travel to other parts of Australia, and Gledden scholarships to assist students in engineering, surveying or the applied sciences generally. The Gledden Building in Perth was named in his honour.

References

External links
Gledden Tavelling Fellowships at the University of Western Australia
History of the Gledden Fellowships

English surveyors
Australian surveyors
Australian philanthropists
People from Sunderland
Australian people of English descent
1855 births
1927 deaths